Bensheim station is in the town of Bensheim on the Main-Neckar Railway, connecting Frankfurt and Heidelberg, in the German state of Hesse. The station is also the beginning and end of the single-track non-electrified Worms–Bensheim line (Nibelung Railway). 114 trains stop at Bensheim station every day, of which about one-third are long-distance services. It is classified by Deutsche Bahn as a category 3 station. Bensheim station is protected as a cultural monument under the Hessian heritage legislation.

History

Almost eleven years after the Adler locomotive began to run over the Bavarian Ludwig Railway between Nuremberg and Fürth, the Main-Neckar Railway was opened in 1846. Bensheim station was opened in the same year. The building of this artery through three small states in the Rhine valley stimulated trade and industry throughout the region. In 1851, the Auerbach district—then still a separate municipality—gained its own station.

In 1869, the Nibelungen railway, a section of the Hessian Ludwig Railway (HLB) was put into operation between Bensheim and Worms. Bensheim now had two railway stations, operated by two railway companies, which were not connected by rail with each other until 1872. As early as 1869 there were plans to extend the Ludwigs Railway to the Odenwald via the Lauter valley to Lindenfels and Reichelsheim to improve transport links. But further attempts to realise this project in 1895, 1925 and 1926 ultimately failed. Between 1910 and 1912, the railway was raised on an embankment through the city area.

In the mid 1990s Bensheim’s freight yard was closed and a few years later the dismantling of its tracks began.

Entrance building

The station building in 1845 was built to plans by Georg Moller in a neoclassical style on the eastern side of the line towards the city. The two-coloured facade of the two-storey, sandstone building had nine bay window around a central group of five windows. In 1900, the outer parts of the facade were replaced by two symmetrically arranged octagonal pavilions designed as porches with further lateral extensions. The eaves of the flat hip roof is decorated with a spiral scroll-like frieze (volute). After Florsheim station, it is the oldest completely preserved station building in Hesse.

Plans
There are plans for the Rhine-Neckar S-Bahn to run between Mannheim and Darmstadt over the Main-Neckar line by 2018, providing connections to the two nearest metropolitan areas of the Rhine-Neckar and the Rhine-Main every half-hour. These plans require the raising of the level of the platforms to the standard height of S-Bahn platforms (76 cm). It is also planned to renovate the station, at a cost of €7.5 million, including an extension of the platforms, so that even long-distance trains can stop at them. The station will also have lifts and escalators, making it accessible for the disabled.

Platforms
Tracks 1 and 2 serve long-distance and regional services (Frankfurt am Main and Heidelberg/Mannheim)
Track 3 serves regional services towards Mannheim (hourly service)
Platform 4 is used for regional services on the Nibelungen line towards Worms (hourly)
Track 5 was used as the passing track for the freight yard (now overgrown and abandoned)

Train services

Long-distance services

Regional services

Bus Station
The bus station is in front of the station building with seven bays and connections to the suburbs of Bensheim by Citybus, and to Lautertal, Bürstadt, Heppenheim, Jugenheim and Lorsch.

Notes

References

External links
 
 

Railway stations in Hesse
Buildings and structures in Bergstraße (district)
Neoclassical architecture in Germany
Railway stations in Germany opened in 1846